The Kai cicadabird (Edolisoma dispar) is a species of bird in the family Campephagidae.
It is endemic to Indonesia.

Its natural habitat is subtropical or tropical moist lowland forest.
It is threatened by habitat loss.

References

Kai cicadabird
Birds of the Kai Islands
Kai cicadabird
Taxonomy articles created by Polbot